Shady Oukhadda (born 17 January 1999) is a professional footballer who plays as a midfielder for  club Modena. Born in Italy, he has represented Morocco at youth international level.

Club career
He made his Serie C debut for Albissola on 19 September 2018 in a game against Olbia.

On 18 July 2019, he joined Siena on loan.

On 3 October 2020, he moved to Gubbio on a permanent basis.

On 25 January 2022, he signed a contract with Modena until 30 June 2025.

References

External links
 
 

1999 births
Living people
Sportspeople from the Province of Padua
Footballers from Veneto
Italian people of Moroccan descent
Italian sportspeople of African descent
Moroccan footballers
Italian footballers
Association football midfielders
Serie C players
Calcio Padova players
Torino F.C. players
Albissola 2010 players
A.C.N. Siena 1904 players
A.S. Gubbio 1910 players
Modena F.C. players
Morocco youth international footballers
Morocco under-20 international footballers